Dohi is a Japanese surname. Notable people with the surname include:

, Japanese dermatologist and urologist
, Japanese footballer

Japanese-language surnames